Bob and Mike Bryan were the defending champions and they reached the final. Michaël Llodra and Nenad Zimonjić defeated them 6–4, 6–7(5–7), [10–5] and won the title.

Seeds
The top eight seeds received a bye into the second round.

Draw

Finals

Top half

Bottom half

References
Main Draw

Rogers Cup Doubles
2011 Rogers Cup